Calling on Youth is the debut studio album by English punk rock band the Outsiders, led by vocalist/guitarist Adrian Borland, who would go on to form the Sound. It was released in May 1977 by record label Raw Edge.

History 
In 1973, Borland and school friends Adrian "Jan" Janes and Bob Lawrence had performed as Syndrome. The band played few gigs and primarily focused on recording their music onto cassettes at home. The band eventually changed their name to the Outsiders, and played gigs at The Roxy with bands such as Generation X, the Jam and the Vibrators.

Background 
Borland designed the album cover for Calling on Youth as well as coming up with the name for the album's record label, Raw Edge. Calling on Youth was mainly recorded in the Borland family home from August to September 1976. engineering was handled by Adrian's father, Bob. Further tracks were recorded or re-recorded in early 1977 at Pathway Studios.

Track listing

Release 
Released in May 1977, Calling on Youth is considered by some to be the first punk LP independently issued in Britain. The record label on which the album was released, Raw Edge, was set up by frontman  Borland's parents. Not all the costs of producing the album were recouped.

Critical reception 

Calling on Youth was poorly received by critics. Sounds described the album as "terribly premature".

Personnel 
 Adrian Borland – vocals, guitar, production
 Bob Lawrence – bass guitar, production
 Adrian Janes – drums, production

 Technical
 Bob Borland – engineering
 Chas Herington – engineering

References

External links
 Sleeve notes for the 2012 reissue of the album
 

1977 debut albums
The Outsiders (British band) albums